Khant Nyar Hein (2003/2004 — 14 March 2021), also known as Lin Yaozong, was a Burmese medical student and activist. He was killed during the 2021 Myanmar protests. Khant Nyar Hein became an icon of the anti-coup protest movement after his death. He is remembered as a martyr of Myanmar's democracy.

Early life 
Khant Nyar Hein was born in 2003 in Latha Township, Yangon, Myanmar into a Burmese-Chinese family. He completed his primary and secondary education at Basic Education High School No. 1 Dagon. At the time of his death, he was a first-year student at University of Medicine 1, Yangon.

Protest and death 
During anti-coup protests in Tamwe Township, he was shot in the head by security forces on 14 March 2021, the bloodiest day until that date during the protests. Citizen video shows police approaching his body, beating up and arresting a young girl who was trying to help him, then later dragging his body away.

"Please don’t hate Chinese in Myanmar. We were born here", Khant Nyar Hein's mother appealed to the people of Myanmar shortly after her son was shot dead by police. Speaking in fluent Mandarin, she called on the Chinese government to hear their pleas. Hundreds of young mourners spilled out on to the street at the funeral of Khant Nyar Hein. Members of the medical community held up the three finger salute at the funeral.

Legacy
Video of the police's brutal handling of his body in the minutes following the shooting quickly spread on social media and he has become something of an icon for supporters of the pro-democracy movement around the world.

References 

2021 deaths
Burmese democracy activists
Burmese people of Chinese descent
Deaths by firearm in Myanmar
Protests in Myanmar
March 2021 events in Asia
Protest-related deaths
2021 in Myanmar